is a former table tennis player from Japan.

Table tennis career
In 1969 and 1971 she won three medals in doubles, and team events in the World Table Tennis Championships.

The three World Championship medals included two gold medals; one in the Corbillon Cup (women's team event) and one in the doubles with Nobuhiko Hasegawa at the 1969 World Table Tennis Championships.

See also
 List of table tennis players
 List of World Table Tennis Championships medalists

References

Japanese female table tennis players
Aichi Institute of Technology alumni